The New England Intercollegiate Hockey League is a defunct NCAA Division I ice hockey-only conference. The league was an early attempt by second-tier programs to form a conference and stabilize their schedules during the Great Depression. The champion of the league received the Donald Sands Memorial Trophy.

History
While the upper echelon of college hockey teams had been creating formal leagues for decades, many of the 'lesser' schools were frozen out of these conferences. In the mid-30's, several teams in New England decided to band together and form their own aggregation, the New England Intercollegiate Hockey League. Originally, The league was made up by eight members, however, there were few requirements with regards to participation. All games between league members were counted in the standings, however, teams were not required to play against all of their conference opponents. This loose policy led to an unbalanced schedule and the teams with the superior records not necessarily being the best.

The league continued unaltered until World War II forced several members to suspend operations. In 1942, Hew Hampshire, Colby and Bowdoin were replaced by Tufts and Norwich. The following year, the league was suspended due to most other programs stopping for the duration of the war. The league returned in 1946, once college hockey resumed in full. A year later, the league held its first postseason and became the first unofficial conference to hold a postseason game in over 40 years. In 1949, Boston College became the first league member to win a National Championship.

Unfortunately, despite the successes of some members, the league itself was not in a good position. Because members weren't required to play one another, the better programs could ignore the lower clubs, creating an effective class system within the conference. Additionally, upon the creation of the Tri-State League in 1950, the NEIHL was one of three conferences in the northeast and not the best of the bunch. The conference continued during the early years of the 1950s but, after Boston College didn't bother attending the conference tournament in 1952, the postseason was abandoned. In its place, BC, BU and Northeastern joined with Harvard to found the Beanpot the following year. Largely superfluous by then, the league fizzled and was formally dissolved in 1954.

While the conference's demise was unfortunate, all of the league members would eventually join to help form ECAC Hockey in 1961, a 28-team super-conference. All except for Fort Devens State, which closed its doors in 1949.

Members

Membership timeline

Champions

* Boston College defeated Northeastern twice during the season and finished with an undefeated record in league play, however, because the Eagles only played 4 games due to issues from the war, they were ruled to have not played sufficient games to qualify for the championship.^ Rather than a conference tournament, the NEIHL held an invitational tournament that included non-conference teams.

See also
 Beanpot (ice hockey)
 ECAC Hockey

References

Defunct NCAA Division I ice hockey conferences
Sports in the Eastern United States